The Kyongnam Shinmun is one of two daily newspapers covering the South Korean province of Gyeongsangnam-do. Its headquarters are in Changwon. Like most of the country's newspapers, it publishes entirely in Korean and does not publish on Sunday. Its competitor is the Gyeongnam Ilbo.  

The company was founded in March 1946 in Masan. It sent its first correspondent to Seoul 10 years later. In 2002, it appointed its current CEO, Kim Jo-il.

See also
List of newspapers
Communications in South Korea

External links
Official site

Newspapers published in South Korea
South Gyeongsang Province
Mass media in Changwon